Andrew Crofts may refer to:
 Andrew Crofts (author) (born 1953), British author
 Andrew Crofts (footballer) (born 1984), Wales international footballer
 Andy Crofts (born 1977), English musician, singer-songwriter and photographer

See also
Andrew Croft (disambiguation)